Lucid is the fourth studio album by French-Nigerian singer Aṣa. It was released on October 11, 2019, through Chapter Two Records and Wagram Music. It is a soul, folk, and rock album that incorporates elements of funk and folk rock. It is more personal and less political compared to her previous albums. The production was primarily handled by drummer Marlon B and contains additional elements of jazz, reggae and neo-soul. The album's title depicts the place where she is currently at in her life.

Sonically, Lucid utilizes piano-led ballads, strings and soft brass to tell a tale of the brokenhearted. The lyrics explore topics such as love, heartbreak, self-discovery, empowerment, joy, pain and identity. The album's singles "The Beginning", "Good Thing", and "My Dear" were all released in 2019. The album received generally positive reviews from music critics, who commended the symbolic nature of Aṣa's songwriting and considered it to be her deepest and most emotionally robust record. The album was supported by a Lucid album tour, which commenced in November 2019.

Background and promotion
Aṣa took a five-year hiatus from music before revealing plans to release Lucid. On France 24, she recalled making an attempt to "live normal" during her hiatus. In September 2019, Aṣa announced the album's title, cover art, and release date simultaneously. In an interview with Griot magazine the following month, she said the title Lucid depicts the place where she is currently at in her life. Aṣa said some of the songs were written in her flat in Paris while others were written at her studio in Lagos. She also stated to have written the album like a diary and poured all of her "joy, heartbreak, laughter and longing" on it. Prior to releasing Lucid, Aṣa released the singles "The Beginning" and "Good Thing", along with their accompanying music videos.

In November 2019, Aṣa embarked on the Lucid album tour. She performed in major cities of France, Germany, and Switzerland. Aṣa was scheduled to headline the Asa Live in Lagos concert, which would have occurred at the Eko Convention Centre on April 11, 2020. However, she ended up canceling the concert and her remaining tour dates due to the ongoing COVID-19 pandemic.

Music and lyrics
Lucid comprises 14 tracks and is a follow-up to Aṣa's critically acclaimed third studio album, Bed of Stone (2014); it is a soul, folk and rock album that incorporates elements of funk and folk rock. Compared to Aṣa's previous albums, Lucid is more personal and less political. It was primarily produced by drummer Marlon B, and contains additional elements of jazz, reggae, and neo-soul. Sonically, Lucid utilizes piano-led ballads, strings and soft brass to tell a tale of the brokenhearted. It explores topics such as love, heartbreak, self-discovery, empowerment, joy, pain and identity.

The first song of Lucid, "Murder in the USA", is a melancholic track that is reminiscent of "Dead Again" from Bed of Stone; it makes allusions to police and uses homicide as a metaphor to resolve a doomed romance. In "The Beginning", Aṣa's vocals are reminiscent of Victoria Legrand. The song furthers the album's narrative undertones and was inspired by a quote from a Hindu saint who offered advice to a group of people quarreling on the Ganges. Pulse Nigeria's Motolani Alake described "The Beginning" as a "lo-fi, melodious post-break-up song that details the residual love still between the warring partners". Zama Mdoda of Afropunk.com praised Aṣa's vocal tone and said the song "lifts and uplifts".

"Good Thing" is an ode to moving on after an unfavorable circumstance; the song features a pop-soul instrumental arrangement. In "Stay Tonight", Aṣa claims arguments and improper timing as reasons for relationship failures; the song's production is reminiscent of tracks produced by Starsailor and Daft Punk. In the guitar ballad "Torn", Aṣa sings about a desire to rip her lover's heart in half if he puts her through a heartbreak; she also contends with harsh truths and hard-earned lessons. In the jazz-infused ballad "Happy People", Aṣa forgets her worries and documents the happiness associated with Nigerian parties. "You and Me" contains an uptempo drum beat and guitar strumming; it has been described as the "happiest song on the album". The sentimental ballad "Femi Mo" (English: "Don't Want Me Anymore"), which was performed entirely in Yoruba, addresses the breakup of a 10-year relationship.

"Makes No Sense" provides a dose of self-awareness and portrays Aṣa as someone who has been hurt. "365" documents the end of a five-year emotionally-draining relationship. Leslie Addo described "9 Lives" as "a message to Aṣa's former lover on the strength of her character". Logan February said the song "falls short as a formidable statement, but works as a humanistic representation of the damage endured even by the strong". In the soul-inspired track "Don't Let Me Go", Aṣa uses soliloquy to address a looming breakup. The closing track to Lucid, "My Dear", is a melancholic counterpart to "Happy People", with Aṣa singing about her love interest being absent from their engagement party.

Singles
Lucids lead single, "The Beginning", was released on May 14, 2019. Aṣa teased the song on Instagram prior to its release. The album's second single, "Good Thing", was released on June 25, 2019. The accompanying music video was directed by Sesan and released two months later. The video features a woman who is acceptant of her vitiligo and another who overcomes the urge of overdosing. On September 27, 2019, Aṣa released the third and final single, "My Dear", along with a live rendition video recorded at Studios Ferber in Paris.

Critical reception

Lucid was met with generally positive reviews from music critics. Motolani Alake of Pulse Nigeria commended the album for showing Aṣa documenting three different thematic perspectives, though he criticized it for having "no sonic uniqueness". Chuks Nwanne from The Guardian said Lucid is "about love in different guises" and praised Aṣa for "amplifying her voice on it". Leslie Addo of Pop Magazine characterized the album as "a masterpiece and personal diary for anyone dealing with a broken heart"; Addo also said Aṣa's lyrical delivery will "give you the imaginative powers to transport yourself to another place".

In a review for The Lagos Review, Logan February said the album "honors the highs and lows of love, and the journey of learning to be alone after the party ends". Music critic Michael Kolawole described Lucid as "a whiplash of emotion, a carefully crafted blow to the heart, an end-product of a wizened soul, and a letter of self-discovery". Kolawole also notes that while the album does not break new ground, it is still a "beautiful album that's designed for the brokenhearted".

In a less enthusiastic review, Carl Terver of Praxis Magazine said Aṣa failed to outdo her last offering with the album and that her lyrics have "become weakened by a preference for popular songwriting". Music critic Dami Ajayi said Lucid is her "ambitious attempt to collapse the ethos of all her previous albums into a formidable product to keep fans swooning for another half decade".

Track listing

Personnel
Credits adapted from Aṣa's interview with Griot magazine. 
Bukola Elemide – primary artist
Marlon B – producer

Release history

References

2019 albums
Aṣa albums
Yoruba-language albums